Alexandru Bozan (born 10 October 1948) is a Romanian equestrian. He competed in the team jumping event at the 1980 Summer Olympics.

References

External links
 

1948 births
Living people
Romanian male equestrians
Olympic equestrians of Romania
Equestrians at the 1980 Summer Olympics
Sportspeople from Sibiu